Andriy Vasylovych Deryzemlya (born 18 August 1977) is a former Ukrainian biathlete who competed at the top level for eleven seasons before winning his first international medal, a bronze medal at the 2007 World Championship. In 2008 together with Oksana Khvostenko he won World Team Challenge.

Deryzemlya retired from the sport after the end of the 2013–14 season, starting a political career. In the 2014 parliamentary election Deryzemlya took part at the single-mandate district No. 205 in Chernihiv Oblast and failed them having finished second with 14.1% of votes. Before that he had founded the Centre for Support of Army in August 2014. On November 29th, 2014, Deryzemlya refused from his plot of land in Chernihiv in favour of the family of perished in Donbass Ukrainian soldier.

Biathlon results
All results are sourced from the International Biathlon Union.

Olympic Games

*Pursuit was added as an event in 2002, with mass start being added in 2006 and the mixed relay in 2014.

World Championships
2 medals (2 bronze)

*During Olympic seasons competitions are only held for those events not included in the Olympic program.
**Team was removed as an event in 1998, and mass start was added in 1999 with the mixed relay being added in 2005.

Individual victories
1 victory (1 MS)

*Results are from UIPMB and IBU races which include the Biathlon World Cup, Biathlon World Championships and the Winter Olympic Games.

References

External links
 
 
 

1977 births
Living people
People from Sumy Oblast
Dynamo sports society athletes
Ukrainian male biathletes
Biathletes at the 1998 Winter Olympics
Biathletes at the 2002 Winter Olympics
Biathletes at the 2006 Winter Olympics
Biathletes at the 2010 Winter Olympics
Biathletes at the 2014 Winter Olympics
Olympic biathletes of Ukraine
Biathlon World Championships medalists
Universiade medalists in biathlon
Ukrainian sportsperson-politicians
Universiade gold medalists for Ukraine
Competitors at the 2003 Winter Universiade
Competitors at the 2005 Winter Universiade